No Fond Return of Love is a novel by Barbara Pym, first published in 1961.

Plot summary
The novel concerns the love lives of two academic researchers, Viola Dace and her friend Dulcie Mainwaring, who are both attracted to the same man, Aylwin Forbes. Dulcie and Viola set about discovering more about his background, which entails a trip to his mother's guest house, which has a ‘bright Christian atmosphere’, in Taviscombe.

Publication history
No Fond Return of Love was Pym's sixth novel, published by Jonathan Cape in 1961. During the writing period, Pym noted that she wanted to write a novel about "the lives of ordinary people". The novel did not receive much critical notice, although was reviewed positively in Tatler, where the reviewer wrote:

Pym's working title was A Thankless Task, in reference to the live of an indexer and assistant researcher. Pym shared the same profession as Viola and Dulcie, having worked at the International African Institute in London since 1946. The publishers felt the title was too negative, and so Pym chose the final title from a poem by eighteenth-century poet Frances Greville (which she altered from "no kind return of love").

The novel was first published in the United States by E. P. Dutton in 1982. No Fond Return of Love was released as an audiobook in the 1980s by Chivers Press read by Angela Pleasence and again in 2010 read by Maggie Mash. The novel was published in Spain as Amor no correspondido, and in Italy in 1991 as Per guarire un cuore infranto (To heal a broken heart) and again in 2014 as Amori non molto corrisposti (Unrequited love)

Connections with other novels
Pym's novels usually feature reappearances from characters from her previous novels. Here, the characters of Wilmet and Rodney Forysth, Piers Longridge and his partner Keith, from A Glass of Blessings appear as tourists visiting the castle. Deirdre Swan and Digby Fox, from Less than Angels, also appear briefly.

For the first time, Pym inserts herself as a cameo appearance. When Dulcie visits a guest house, she notes one of the novels for guests to read is Some Tame Gazelle, Pym's first published novel. The author would insert herself for a second time in An Unsuitable Attachment.

Adaptations
The novel was serialised on the BBC radio programme Woman's Hour in 1965. The novel was adapted for the stage by Adrian Benjamin in 1988, and performed in the United Kingdom and Australia. The novel was adapted for BBC Radio 4 in February 2000 by Elizabeth Proud

References

Further reading
Orna Raz - Social Dimensions in the Novels of Barbara Pym, 1949-1962: the Writer as Hidden Observer (2007)
Paul Binding - "Introduction", in No Fond Return of Love (London: Virago, 2009)

1961 British novels
Novels by Barbara Pym
Novels set in hotels
Jonathan Cape books